Gérard Bougrier (born 1944) is a French civil servant (prefect).

He was born on 30 November 1944 in Rennes, Ille-et-Vilaine, Brittany.

He is a graduate of the Institut d’études politiques de Bordeaux (IEP Bordeaux).

Career 
 1982 - 1985 : sub-prefect of La Flèche in La Flèche City 
 1993 - 8 February 1996 : sub-prefect of Antony in Antony City 
 8 February 1996 - 10 November 1997 : préfet adjoint pour la sécurité auprès des préfets de la Corse-du-Sud et de la Haute-Corse (deputy prefect for the security to the prefects of Corse-du-Sud and of Haute-Corse)
 10 November 1997 - 6 January 2000 : prefect of Hautes-Pyrénées in Tarbes
 6 January 2000 - 1 August  2003 : prefect of Aude in Carcassonne

Honours and awards
 :
 Officier (Officer) of Légion d’honneur

References

1944 births
People from Rennes
Living people
Prefects of France
Prefects of Hautes-Pyrénées
Prefects of Aude
Officiers of the Légion d'honneur